The National Aviary, located in Pittsburgh, Pennsylvania, is the only independent indoor nonprofit aviary in the United States. It is also the country's largest aviary, and the only one accorded honorary "National" status by the United States Congress.

The aviary is home to more than 500 birds representing more than 150 species, and is a member of the Association of Zoos and Aquariums (AZA).

Location and features

The National Aviary is located at 700 Arch Street on Pittsburgh's Northside, within Allegheny Commons West Park in the Allegheny Center neighborhood.

The National Aviary is open daily except Thanksgiving Day, Christmas Eve, and Christmas. Although some of the birds must be fed in private, almost all feedings (both vegetarian and carnivorous) are scheduled to be viewable by visitors. Since 1999, annual attendance has consistently topped 100,000.

The National Aviary has daily interactive experiences for visitors which change seasonally. Some of these include Penguin Feedings at Penguin Point, a habitat that is home to a colony of African Penguins which offers opportunities for underwater viewing; a Penguin Encounter and a Private Penguin Feeding (for additional fees), as well as additional feedings in immersive habitats. These programs are joined by various expert talks, flight demonstrations, and encounters that help to create an immersive experience for visitors.

In the fall of 2010, the National Aviary completed an $18.5 million expansion and renovation project that included the opening of a new café, classrooms, and the Helen M. Schmidt FliteZone Theater.  The Helen M. Schmidt Theater is the first indoor theater in the nation built specifically for bird shows. The Aviary also began outdoor shows (weather permitting) from its new Sky Deck, featuring live flight demonstrations of eagles, falcons and kites out over West Park.

Birds
The Aviary is home to more than 500 birds of more than 150 species, many of which are threatened or endangered in the wild. It has one of the most diverse collections in North America.

As a result, the Aviary has many species that are rarely found in other zoos or aviaries, for example, Andean Condors and the critically endangered Vietnam Pheasant and Bali Myna.

Among the most popular residents are Benito and Sapphira, Hyacinth Macaws, as well as Wookiee the Two-toed Sloth  both can be found in the Tropical Rainforest habitat. The Aviary has also had success in breeding; its spectacled owls had their first chick, named Franklin (after Benjamin Franklin), who hatched in September 2006. Franklin can be seen with one of the trainers, making visits around the Aviary to teach visitors about Spectacled Owls.

The National Aviary also takes part in Species Survival Plans designed to enhance conservation efforts for species including the Bali Myna (nearly extinct in the wild), the Guam Kingfisher, the Indian peacock, and the African Penguin. Its first two African Penguin chicks hatched in February 2012. On March 13, 2013, the Aviary celebrated another success of its breeding program, when a female Eurasian owlet hatched, and within five days, doubled in size.  In January 2021, an endangered African Penguin chick hatched to first time parents Buddy and Holly; this chick is the eleventh to hatch at the National Aviary. 

In 2019, the Guam Rail was downgraded by the IUCN from extinct-in-the-wild status to critically endangered. More Guam Rails have been hatched at the National Aviary than at any other North American zoo.

History and funding
The National Aviary began as part of the Pittsburgh Aviary-Conservatory, built by the city in 1952 on the site of the original Phipps Conservatory and consisting at first of a single structure of 3,640 square feet.  In 1967 an expansion that included the "wetlands room" increased space to 25,000 square feet. Pittsburgh's dwindling urban tax base forced the city to cease funding the institution in 1991.

Public to private
In 1991, neighborhood leaders founded Save the Aviary, Inc. and began an intense public campaign to raise money and develop a plan to privatize the Aviary. Jill Sims, an active volunteer at the Aviary, became the first chairperson of the organization. Mark P. Masterson, a Northside community leader, developed a business plan and secured funding from the Buhl Foundation to produce a capital improvement plan and recruited additional board members. Save the Aviary, Inc. took over the facility and began operations soon after the board of directors hired Dayton Baker as executive director.

National status
On October 27, 1993, by declaration of the U.S. Congress, the Pittsburgh Aviary was designated honorary national status and renamed the National Aviary in Pittsburgh. This was later signed by President Bill Clinton on November 8, 1993. A successful capital campaign was undertaken in 1995 to raise funds for essential renovations, completed in 1997, that thoroughly modernized the facility. In January 2005, the National Aviary created the Department of Conservation and Field Research, which so far has mainly focused on restoring bird populations in foreign countries with histories of extreme environmental degradation.

In July 2006, the Commonwealth of Pennsylvania granted the first $500,000 toward a $22.5 million project that would include a new education center and expanded exhibits, which was slated for opening in 2008. In October 2008, the Aviary announced a $23 million renovation and expansion of exhibition space, the vast majority of which would be paid for by private foundations.

Recent history
Cheryl Tracy has served as the National Aviary’s Executive Director since July 1, 2013. Preceding Tracy in the executive director position were Patrick Mangus, who served from January 2009 to November 2012, Linda Dickerson from April 2007 to January 2009, and Dayton Baker from 1991 to 2007.

As of March 2020, Jane Dixon is the President on the Board of Trustees.

Under Tracy’s leadership, the National Aviary has undertaken several capital campaigns, including the completion of the $17.5 million “Taking Flight” campaign, which included the creation of the Penguin Point habitat home to a colony of endangered African Penguins. In the fall of 2010, the National Aviary completed an $18.5 million expansion and renovation project that included the opening of a new café, classrooms, and the Helen M. Schmidt FliteZone Theater. The Helen M. Schmidt Theater is the first indoor theater in the nation built specifically for bird shows. The Aviary also began outdoor shows (weather permitting) from its new Sky Deck, featuring live flight demonstrations of eagles, falcons and kites out over West Park.

This project was followed by the construction of Condor Court, an outdoor space for Andean Condors designed to mimic the rocky cliffs of the high Andes Mountains. In 2018, the National Aviary’s oldest room, the Tropical Rainforest, underwent a major renovation that included new water features, improved energy efficiencies, and a ceiling made of bird-safe glass. The Tropical Rainforest habitat was the 2019 winner of the Association of Zoos and Aquariums Design Award.

The National Aviary opened The Garden Room, a 9,000-square-foot year-round event and education venue, in October 2020.

On September 25, 2021, a Steller’s Sea Eagle named Kodiak, or Kody, got out of his habitat. After a coordinated effort involving National Aviary staff and volunteers, and the support of community members reporting sightings, Kodiak returned safely to the National Aviary on October 3, 2021.

Gallery

References

External links

Aviaries in the United States
Bird conservation
Zoos in Pennsylvania
Tourist attractions in Pittsburgh
Non-profit organizations based in Pittsburgh
Buildings and structures in Pittsburgh
Environmental organizations based in Pennsylvania
Education in Pennsylvania
Ornithological organizations in the United States
Organizations established in 1952
1952 establishments in Pennsylvania